Danger Island(s) may refer to:

Places
Danger Island, Great Chagos Bank, part of Chagos Archipelago in Indian Ocean
Danger Island, now known as Pukapuka, an atoll of Cook Islands in the Pacific Ocean
Danger Islands, near the tip of the Antarctic Peninsula in the Southern Ocean

Film and television
Danger Island (serial), 1931 American film
Mr. Moto in Danger Island, 1939 American mystery film 
Danger Island (TV series), 1968 American children's serial
Danger Island (film), 1992 American TV film
Danger Island (Archer), 9th season (2018) of American animated TV series

Video games 

 Danger Island (video game), a 1997 FMV game also known as Area D

See also
Dangar Island, island in New South Wales